The U.S. Senior Women's Open is one of fourteen U.S. national golf championships organized by the United States Golf Association. The newest USGA championship, it is open to women whose 50th birthday falls on or before the first day of competition and hold a handicap index not exceeding 7.4. It is part of the Legends of the LPGA Tour. The inaugural championship was held in 2018 at the Chicago Golf Club in Wheaton, Illinois.

The U.S. Senior Women's Open and the Senior LPGA Championship are considered to constitute the senior women's major golf championships. The eligibility for the Senior LPGA Championship and the Legends of the LPGA Tour are for female golfers age 45 and older, why not all Senior LPGA Championship players are eligible for the U.S. Senior Women's Open.

The field for the tournament is 120 players and is filled with professionals and amateurs with exemptions and sectional qualifying status. The tournament is 72 holes of stroke play, with the top 50 and ties making the 36-hole cut. Winners gain an exemption into the following year's U.S. Women's Open.

Eligibility
The following players are exempt from qualifying for the U.S. Senior Women's Open, provided they are 50 years old. Senior amateur categories require players to still be amateurs. For the first three editions of the tournament, golfers eligible in categories with an upper age limit, were eligible regardless of that.

Winners of the U.S. Senior Women's Open who have not yet reached their 66th birthdays on or before the final day of the championship or winners in the past ten years, regardless of age
The top 20 (and ties) from the previous year's U.S. Senior Women's Open
The low amateur from the previous year's U.S. Senior Women's Open
 Winners of the U.S. Women's Open to 59 years of age
 From the two most recent U.S. Women's Open, any player returning a 72-hole score
 Finalist in the U.S. Women's Amateur the previous year
 Winners of the U.S. Women's Amateur (if turned professional a three-year exemption and if remained amateur a five-year exemption)
 Winners of the women's majors to 59 years of age – Chevron Championship, AIG Women's Open Championship (2001-), KPMG Women's PGA Championship, Evian Championship (2013-) and du Maurier Classic (1979 - 2000)
 Winner and runner-up of the previous U.S. Senior Women's Amateur
 The winner of the U.S. Senior Women's Amateur the last two years
 Winner of the past two U.S. Women's Mid-Amateur
 Members of either two of the two more recent Curtis Cup teams
 Members of the two most recent U.S. Espirito Santo Trophy teams
 Playing members of the five most recent Solheim Cup teams
 Top 30 players from the previous year's final Legends Tour money list
 Top 10 money leaders of all-time Legends Tour earnings
 Top 15 money leaders on the current Legends Tour money list
 Winners of Legends Tour events, excluding team events, in the last two years and current year
 Top 75 LPGA Tour money leaders all-time
 Winners of The Womens Amateur Championship 50 to 52 years of age
 Winners of the LPGA Teaching and Club Professional Championship in the past five years and the second-place finisher in the most recent edition
 Winners of LPGA Tour events, in the current and last five years
 Top five money leaders from the previous year's final Ladies European Tour and LPGA of Japan Tour career money lists
 Winners of the most current Senior Ladies' British Open Amateur and Canadian Senior Women's Amateur championships
 Special exemptions

Winners

Sources:

Future sites

References

External Links

United States Golf Association championships
Legends Tour
Women's golf tournaments in the United States
Senior women's major golf championships
Recurring sporting events established in 2018
2018 establishments in Illinois